Paul Rubens may refer to:

Paul Rubens (composer) (1875–1917), English songwriter and librettist
Paul Reubens (born 1952), American actor, writer, film producer, and comedian

See also
Peter Paul Rubens (1577–1640), Flemish Baroque painter